Ken Harry Matthews  is a retired senior Australian public servant.

Early life and background
Ken Matthews grew up on a farm near Griffith, New South Wales. He attended Griffith High School.

Matthews graduated from University of Sydney in 1974 with a Bachelor of Economics, majoring in government.

Career
Ken Matthews joined the Australian Public Service in 1975, in the Department of Defence.

In 1998 Matthews was appointed Secretary of the Department of Primary Industries and Energy (later Department of Agriculture, Fisheries and Forestry).

In 1999 Matthews shifted to head the Department of Transport and Regional Services. Matthews headed the Department at the time of the September 11 attacks on the United States and during implementation of early stages of the Howard Government counter-terrorism strategies.

In 2004, Matthews indicated to Prime Minister John Howard his keen interest in water reform and was appointed the first Chief Executive Officer and Chair of the National Water Commission, to be established in the Prime Minister's portfolio. Matthews retired as Chair and Chief Executive of the National Water Commission in October 2010. In his valedictory speech, he told his audience he wanted public servants to be bolder.

Matthews created controversy in 2007 when a leaked e-mail concerning a federal proposal to tax rainwater revealed Matthews (as chief of the National Water Commission) writing: "if rainwater tanks were to be adopted on a large scale such that their existence impacts significantly on the integrated water cycle, consideration could be given to setting an entitlement regime for this class of water" and "legally, all water in Australia is vested in governments." The Bracks government at the time stated it was opposed to taxes on rainwater.

Awards
In January 2005, Matthews was made an Officer of the Order of Australia for service to the community through the development of more competitive and sustainable regional industries and services, to the national transport system, and to promoting the highest standards of public administration. Matthews had previously received a Centenary Medal in 2001 for services to public administration.

Flinders University presented Matthews with an honorary doctorate in April 2014.

References

Living people
Year of birth missing (living people)
Australian public servants
Officers of the Order of Australia
Recipients of the Centenary Medal
University of Sydney alumni